Vrať se do hrobu! (English title: Ready for the Grave, literally Go back to grave) is a Czech comedy film directed by Milan Šteindler. It was released in 1990.

External links
 

1990 films
Czechoslovak comedy films
1990 comedy films
Czech comedy films